The decade of the 1520s in music (years 1520–1529) involved some significant events, compositions, publications, births, and deaths.

Events 
 7–24 June 1520: Field of the Cloth of Gold held at Balinghem. The court musical establishments of Francis I of France and Henry VIII of England were led by Jean Mouton and William Cornysh, respectively.
 1521: Diet of Worms. The composer Ludwig Senfl is present.
 1526: Kungliga Hovkapellet is first recorded from this year.

Publications 

 1520: 
The manuscript Capirola Lutebook is compiled from the works of Vincenzo Capirola
Bernardo Pisano, Musica di messer Bernardo Pisano sopra le canzone del Petrarcha, the first printed collection of secular music by a single composer, published by Ottaviano Petrucci in Fossombrone.
The Liber selectarum cantionum is printed in Augsburg in the print-shop of Sigmund Grimm and Markus Wirsung. The music is compiled by Ludwig Senfl who includes compositions of his own like his riddle canon Salve sancta parens.
 1523: Pietro Aron – , including the first description of quarter-comma meantone, published in Venice.
 1528:
Pierre Attaingnant (ed.) – , the first French music publication made using single-impression movable type, published in Paris.
Clément Janequin –  (Paris: Pierre Attaingant)
 1529: Martin Agricola – , a description of the musical instruments common in Germany at the time.

Classical music 
 1524: Gasparo Alberti – Missa de Sancto Roccho, for six voices
 1525: My Lady Carey's Dompe is written for harpsichord by an unknown composer.

Births

1520
 Andrea Amati, Italian violin maker, who stands as the first of the Cremona school  (d. c.1578)
 Christoph Fischer or Vischer (c.1518/1520), hymnist (died 1598)
 Vincenzo Galilei (c.1520), lutenist who also composed other music  (died 1591)

1521
 Philippe de Monte, Flemish composer of Italian madrigals (died 1603)

1525
March 4 – Giovanni Pierluigi da Palestrina, Roman composer, primarily of sacred music (died 1594)
March 25 – Richard Edwardes, English choral musician, playwright and poet (died 1566)

1528
October 4 – Francisco Guerrero, Spanish composer (died 1599)
date unknown – Thomas Whythorne, English composer (died 1595)

1529
 probable – Jacobus Vaet, Franco-Flemish composer (died 1567)

Deaths 
 1521: 
August 27 – Josquin des Prez, Franco-Flemish composer (born c.1450–1455)
October 24 – Robert Fayrfax, English Renaissance composer (born 1464) 
 1522: October 30 – Jean Mouton, French composer (born c.1459)
 1523: October – William Cornysh, English composer (born 1465)
 1524: July 31 – Sebastiano Festa, Italian composer (born c.1490)
 1525: probable – Arnolt Schlick, German organist and composer (born c.1460)
 1526: date unknown – Thomas Stoltzer, German composer (born c,1480)
 1527: June 9 – Heinrich Finck, German composer (born c.1444)
 1528: April 1 – Francisco de Peñalosa, Spanish composer (born 1470)

 
Music
16th century in music